Sofia Kenin was the defending champion, but chose not to participate.

Madison Brengle won the title, defeating Mayo Hibi in the final, 7–5, 6–4.

Seeds

Draw

Finals

Top half

Bottom half

References

Main Draw

Berkeley Tennis Club Challenge - Singles